Grevillea capitellata is a species of flowering plant in the family Proteaceae and is endemic to the Illawarra region of New South Wales. It is a low, dense mounded or prostrate shrub with narrowly elliptic to oblong leaves, and dull, deep crimson to dark maroon flowers.

Description
The flowers are arranged in more or less spherical groups often near ground level.

Taxonomy
Grevillea capitellata was first formally described in 1856 by Carl Meissner in de Candolle's Prodromus Systematis Naturalis Regni Vegetabilis from specimens collected by Allan Cunningham near Port Jackson. The specific epithet (capitellata) means "forming a small head".

Distribution and habitat
This grevillea grows in poorly drained places including in swamp margins and occurs in the far south of the Sydney Basin and the northern Illawarra region.

References

capitellata
Proteales of Australia
Flora of New South Wales
Plants described in 1856
Taxa named by Carl Meissner